The Battle of Topáter, or Battle of Calama, was fought on March 23, 1879 between Chile and Bolivia. It was the first battle of the War of the Pacific.

The Chileans were taking possession of the Antofagasta (Litoral) Province, then a part of Bolivia. The few Bolivian troops decided to make a stand in the town of Calama. On their way to occupy Calama, 554 Chilean troops, including cavalry and with two Krupp rifled guns, were opposed by 135 Bolivian soldiers and civilian residents led by Dr. Ladislao Cabrera, a civilian and a political authority in the region.

The Bolivians fought next to the Topáter ford, which runs outside the city. Cabrera dug in at two destroyed bridges; calls to surrender were rejected before and during the battle. Outnumbered and low in ammunition, most of the Bolivian force eventually withdrew except for a small group of civilians, led by Colonel Eduardo Abaroa, that fought to the end.

The Bolivian national hero, Abaroa, died in the battle. Further ground battles would not take place until the war at sea had been completed.

References 

Battles involving Chile
Battles involving Bolivia
Battles of the War of the Pacific
Conflicts in 1879
1879 in Chile
1879 in Bolivia
Battle of Topater
March 1879 events